The Trans-Balkan pipeline is a natural gas pipeline between Turkey and Ukraine with branches to Greece and North Macedonia. It was used by Gazprom for gas deliveries through Balkan countries to Turkey. Before construction of the Blue Stream pipeline it was the only international natural gas pipeline supplying Turkey.

Pipelines of the southern corridor of the natural gas transmission system of Ukraine are connected with the Trans-Balkan pipeline through the Orlivka gas metering and compressor station. 

Since 2020, its section in Bulgaria from Malkoçlar on the Turkey–Bulgaria border up to the compressor station in Provadia, north-east of Bulgaria, has been used for transportation of natural gas received from TurkStream. It can also be used in reverse mode to receive Azerbaijani gas via the Trans-Anatolian pipeline, with a capacity of 17 to 20 or 25 bcm per year. Romania is also a participant in the Trans-Balkan pipeline. In 2022 about 2 bcm from Turkstream was sent to Romania through the Trans-Balkan pipeline. It has been suggested that Moldova could receive Azerbaijani gas through the pipeline and the TANAP pipeline.

External links
 Trans-Balkan Pipeline on Global Energy Monitor

References

Natural gas pipelines in Bulgaria
Natural gas pipelines in Greece
Natural gas pipelines in North Macedonia
Natural gas pipelines in Romania
Natural gas pipelines in Turkey